Peter Charles McCarthy Robinson (9 November 1951 – 6 October 2004) was an English comedian, radio and television presenter and travel writer. He was noted for his best-selling travel books McCarthy's Bar (2000) and The Road to McCarthy (2002), in which he explored Ireland and the Irish diaspora around the world.

Born in Warrington, Lancashire to an English father of Irish descent and an Irish mother, McCarthy spent much of his early life in his mother's homeland, developing a love for the country. After attending West Park Grammar School, he later decided to become a writer, studying English at Leicester University. After a brief stint as a teacher, he moved to Brighton, where he was involved in local art community projects and first involved himself in comedy, co-founding a comedy troupe known as Cliff Hanger Theatre with Robin Driscoll, Steve McNicholas, Tony Haase and Rebecca Stevens. Touring the country and winning various awards, they also produced two television shows for Channel 4 and BBC Two.

Going solo, McCarthy began a career as a stand-up comic and comedy writer. After his success with The Hangover Show in 1990, he was employed to present a number of television and radio shows, including Desperately Seeking Something (1995–1998), Breakaway and Country Tracks. Turning his attention to travel writing, in 2000 he published McCarthy's Bar, which detailed his travels around Western Ireland. After it proved a critical and commercial success, he authored a second tome, The Road to McCarthy, based on his journeys through the Irish diaspora in the New York City, Montana, Alaska, Tasmania and Montserrat. A third book remained unfinished when he died of cancer in 2004.

Biography

Early life : 1951–1974
McCarthy was born on 9 November 1951 in Warrington, Lancashire. His mother had moved to England from her native Ireland during the Second World War to work as a nurse. It was during this time that she met her future husband at a dance, and they would have four children, of whom Peter was the eldest. McCarthy was educated at West Park Grammar School in St Helens, a Roman Catholic institution run by the Christian Brothers. He later characterised this experience as "a mixture of hellfire and brimstone, corporal punishment and awakening sexuality", while describing the Christian Brothers' authoritarian education methods as "Carrot and stick without the carrot".

As a child, he spent his school holidays in Drimoleague in West Cork, Ireland. He stayed there with relatives on a farm called "Butlersgift", a place that he later described as emerging "straight from a story book". This time spent in Ireland proved influential in inspiring his later fascination with the country, which exhibited itself in his travel writing. In his teenage years, he considered becoming a member of the Roman Catholic clergy, but was convinced otherwise by his local priest. After reading James Joyce's Portrait of the Artist at the age of 14, he instead decided to become a writer. He attended Leicester University, where he earned a first-class degree in English literature, before studying at a teacher training college. Qualified to become a teacher, he obtained a job teaching English and Drama at a comprehensive school on the coast of Suffolk.

Comedy and television: 1975–1997
In 1975, McCarthy moved to the town of Brighton in East Sussex, working on a community arts project in the nearby Shoreham-by-Sea; this led to his first television appearance, on Tommy Tractor's Triffic Toyshop Show (1977), a show for primary school children. Striving for a career in comedy, he co-founded Cliff Hanger Theatre with his friends Robin Driscoll, Steve McNicholas, Tony Haase and Rebecca Stevens, who toured the country appearing in pubs. Their first show, The Featherstone Flyer (1978), was pioneered in the Hope and Anchor pub in Islington, North London, and would be followed up by a series of other shows in ensuing years; Dig for Victory (1980–81),Captive Audience (1981–82), They Came From Somewhere Else! (1982–83) and Gymslip Vicar (1984-85), the latter being nominated for a Laurence Olivier Award. The success of the stage shows led to the creation of two television series They Came From Somewhere Else (1984) for Channel 4 and Mornin' Sarge (1989) on BBC Two.

In 1987, McCarthy began to perform solo standup, adopting his mother's surname as his stage name after learning of another actor using the name of Peter Robinson. For the 1987 Brighton Festival, he created Boredom and Black Magic in Hove, a three-hour coach tour and pub crawl. McCarthy acted as guide, inventing surreal explanations for the sights of Brighton's then more stuffy neighbour. Audiences 'had to jump across the border from Brighton to Hove, where they were handed a glass of sweet sherry. Pete then took them on a tour around Hove, making up the sights as he went along.' The show won the best cabaret act in the 1987 Zap Club Awards.

McCarthy's next show was Live in Your Living Room, which he performed from 1987–8 at the Edinburgh, Melbourne and Brighton festivals, in people's bedrooms, bathrooms and living rooms, to audiences of 10-20 people. Its subject was the metaphysical effects of a hangover. The Brighton Argus reviewer wrote, 'The hour-long tour-de-force begins with an apparently hungover Peter in bed, surrounded by empty bottles, and transfers to the living room, where he sports a revolting 1970s stretch burgundy outfit, threatens a striptease and then fortunately changes his mind....In between he delivers a quick-fire monologue which develops from the perils of drinking to tragicomic stuff touching on loneliness, death and unrequited love.'

McCarthy explored the same theme further in The Hangover Show, in 1990, directed by John Dowie. For this, he was awarded both the Critic's Award for Best Comedy as well as a Perrier Award at the Edinburgh Festival Fringe. The show was also developed into a one-off television special for BBC Scotland, broadcast on New Year's Day 1991.
 
As a stand-up comedian, he often drew from his Irish Catholic background as a source of comedy, regularly compering at The Comedy Store in Central London. With the Liverpudlian poet Roger McGough he performed in a two-man comedy show, touring Britain and Australia. In the 1980s he also began writing television scripts and gags for the comedians Mel Smith and Griff Rhys Jones.

As a result of The Hangover Show, in 1990, McCarthy was offered an own television travel programme by Channel 4. Entitled Travelog, it offered an alternative travel programme which had little in common with the traditional travel show format. It was a "marvellous experience" for McCarthy who said about this time: "We travelled to Zanzibar and China, Fiji and Corsica, Costa Rica and Laos; stood on the edge of volcanoes, had lunch with heroes of the Crete resistance, and got caught up in a military coup in Vanuatu". Throughout the rest of the 1990s, McCarthy starred in a string of other television and radio shows. These included BBC 2's Country Tracks (1998), Meridian Television's The Pier and Channel 4's Desperately Seeking Something (1995–1998), an exploration of alternative religious movements around the world. For BBC Radio 4, he presented Breakaway, First Impressions, X Marks the Spot, American Beauty, and Cajun Country, as well as appearing as a regular guest on Loose Ends, Just a Minute and The News Quiz.

Travel writing: 1998–2004

In March 1998, the publishing house Hodder and Stoughton brought out McCarthy's first travel book, McCarthy's Bar: A Journey Of Discovery In Ireland. The work followed McCarthy's journey in Ireland over a six-month period by travelling from the south to the north-west of the country. A commercial success, it would sell over a million copies; in response, he admitted "to a childlike pleasure in seeing my own book take its place on the shelves among writers I've admired for years. And if the literary life gets a little dull, there's always the thrill of going into W H Smith and moving McCarthy's Bar in front of Bill Bryson before anyone catches you." The Daily Telegraph described it as an "affectionate, revealing and well-lubricated look at the changing face of a country" which discussed a series of "wide-eyed encounters".

In 2002, his follow-up book appeared as The Road to McCarthy.

Peter McCarthy wrote his books with pen and paper and upon answering a question that asked if he was a technophobe replied: "Yes big time. I've got a kettle and a fridge, but I don't own a computer, a word processor or even a typewriter." Moving from Brighton to a village in the South Downs in East Sussex with his family, he enjoyed taking solitary walks across the Downs, describing the landscape as "a kind of neolithic M25".

After the success of his previous books, McCarthy was planning on writing a third travel work, exploring the six counties of Northern Ireland. The diagnosis of cancer in February 2004 changed this. McCarthy died at the Royal Sussex Hospital in Brighton on 6 October 2004; he was survived by his wife Irene and three daughters, Alice, Isabella and Coral.

Bus operator Brighton & Hove named one of its fleet – bus 913 – after him in September 2006.

Radio credits 
Radio shows he presented:
Breakaway
First Impressions
X Marks the Spot
American Beauty
Cajun Country

Radio shows he regularly starred in:
Loose Ends
Just a Minute
The News Quiz

Television credits 
He presented:
Travelog
Country Tracks
The Pier
Desperately Seeking Something
He appeared in:
 They Came from Somewhere Else

Awards
Critics' Award for Best Comedy, Edinburgh Festival Fringe 1990 for Hangover Show
Newcomer of the Year, British Book Awards 2002

References

Bibliography

External links 
 Official Pete McCarthy site
 UK Gameshows entry
 Telegraph obituary
 

1951 births
2004 deaths
Alumni of the University of Leicester
British Book Award winners
English travel writers
Deaths from cancer in England
English male non-fiction writers
English people of Irish descent
People from Warrington
20th-century English male writers